Bani Margham is a sub-district located in Al Qafr District, Ibb Governorate, Yemen. Bani Margham had a population of  2855 as of 2004.

References 

Sub-districts in Al Qafr District